Suzanne Marie Somers (née Mahoney; born October 16, 1946) is an American actress, author, singer, businesswoman, and health spokesperson. She appeared in the television role of Chrissy Snow on Three's Company and as Carol Foster Lambert on Step by Step.

Somers later became the author of a series of self-help books, including Ageless: The Naked Truth About Bioidentical Hormones (2006), about bioidentical hormone replacement therapy. She has released two autobiographies, four diet books, and a book of poetry.

Somers has been criticized for her views on some medical subjects and her advocacy of the Wiley Protocol, which has been labelled as "scientifically unproven and dangerous". Her promotion of alternative cancer treatments has received criticism from the American Cancer Society.

Personal life
Born Suzanne Marie Mahoney in San Bruno, California. Somers is the third of four children in an Irish-American Catholic family. Her mother, Marion Elizabeth (née Turner), was a medical secretary, and her father, Francis Mahoney, was a laborer and gardener. When Suzanne was six years old her father became an alcoholic. Somers' father would call her names and embarrass her.

Somers attended Capuchino High School She also said she was a cheerleader at Mercy High School in Burlingame, California, and was accepted at San Francisco College for Women, a college run by the Catholic Society of the Sacred Heart order. Somers married Bruce Somers in 1965, when she was 19, and they had a son, Bruce Jr., in November 1965. That marriage ended in 1968.

Somers became a prize model on Anniversary Game (1969–70), where she met host Alan Hamel. They married in 1977.

Somers has three granddaughters, Camelia, Violet and Daisy Hamel-Buffa.

Somers was diagnosed with stage II breast cancer in April 2000, and had a lumpectomy to remove the cancer followed by radiation therapy, but decided to forgo chemotherapy in favor of a fermented mistletoe extract called Iscador.

On January 9, 2007, the Associated Press reported that a wildfire in Southern California had destroyed Somers' Malibu home.

Career

Early acting roles
Somers began acting in small roles during the late 1960s and early 1970s (including on various talk shows promoting her book of poetry, and bit parts in movies, such as the "Blonde in the white Thunderbird" in American Graffiti, and an episode of the American version of the sitcom Lotsa Luck (as the femme fatale) in the early 1970s. She also appeared in The Rockford Files in 1974 and had an uncredited role as a topless "pool girl" in Magnum Force in 1973. She also had a guest-starring role on The Six Million Dollar Man, in the 1977 episode "Cheshire Project,” she played a passenger on the first episode of The Love Boat as well as a guest appearance in a 1976 episode of One Day at a Time.  She later landed her most famous role of the ditzy blonde "Chrissy Snow" on the ABC sitcom Three's Company in 1977. Also that year, she was a celebrity panelist on Match Game, and appeared with husband Alan Hamel on Tattletales.

Three's Company

 
Somers was cast in the ABC sitcom Three's Company in January 1977. After actresses Suzanne Zenor and Susan Lanier did not impress producers during the first two pilots, Somers was suggested by ABC president  Fred Silverman, who had seen her on the Tonight Show and she was auditioned and hired the day before the taping of the third and final pilot officially commenced. She portrayed Chrissy Snow, a stereotypical dumb blonde, who was employed as an office secretary.

The series co-starred John Ritter and Joyce DeWitt in a comedy of errors about two single women  living with a single man who pretends to be gay in order to bypass the landlord's policy prohibiting single men sharing an apartment with single women. The program was an instant success in the ratings, eventually spawning a short-lived spin-off series (starring Norman Fell and Audra Lindley).

When Three's Company began its fifth season in late 1980, Somers demanded a hefty salary increase from $30,000 to $150,000 an episode and 10 percent ownership of the show's profits. Those close to the situation suggested that Somers' rebellion was largely due to husband Hamel's influences.
After ABC denied her a raise in salary, Somers refused to appear in the second and fourth episodes of the season, due to excuses such as a broken rib. She finished the remaining season on her contract, but her role was decreased to just 60 seconds per episode, her character only appearing in the episode's closing tag in which Chrissy calls the trio's apartment from her parents' home. After ABC fired her from the program and terminated her contract, Somers sued the network for $2 million, saying her credibility in show business had been damaged. The lawsuit was settled by an arbitrator who decided Somers was owed $30,000, due to a single missed episode for which she had not been paid. Future rulings also favored the network and  producers. Somers says she was fired for asking to be paid as much as popular male television stars of the day such as Alan Alda and Carroll O'Connor.

In 1983, Suzanne Somers through her Hamel/Somers Productions had signed a deal with Columbia Pictures Television.

Somers and her Three's Company co-star John Ritter reconciled their friendship after 20 years of not speaking to each other, shortly before Ritter's death in 2003.

Playboy pictorials
Somers appeared in two Playboy cover-feature nude pictorials, in 1980 and 1984. Her first set of nude photos was taken by Stan Malinowski in February 1970 when Somers was a struggling model and actress and did a test photoshoot for the magazine. She was accepted as a Playmate candidate in 1971, but declined to pose nude before the actual shoot. During an appearance on The Tonight Show, she denied ever posing nude (except for a High Society topless photo), which prompted Playboy to publish photos from the 1970 Malinowski shoot a decade later, in 1980. Somers' original motivation for posing nude was to be able to pay medical bills related to injuries her son Bruce Jr. suffered in a car accident. By the time the photos were published, her son was 14 and Somers feared  seeing his mother posing nude would be difficult for him. Somers sued Playboy and settled for $50,000—which was donated to charity, at least $10,000 of it going to the Easter Seals. The second nude pictorial by Richard Fegley appeared in December 1984 in an attempt by Somers to regain her diminished popularity after the Three's Company debacle in 1981. Despite her anger and the earlier lawsuit, Playboy approached her earlier that year to pose nude a second time. Initially she was angered again, but eventually agreed after discussing it with her family. She felt she would have a better chance to control the quality of the photos the second time, and having such control was an important condition that Somers attached to posing. Despite Somers' earlier belief that her son would not want to see his mother nude, her then 18-year-old son did view the second pictorial.

Spokeswoman for the Thighmaster
During the 1980s, Somers became a Las Vegas entertainer. In the early 1990s, she was the spokeswoman in a series of infomercials for the Thighmaster, a piece of exercise equipment that is squeezed between one's thighs.  During this period of her career, she also performed for U.S. servicemen overseas.<ref>O'Connor, John J., "TV: Suzanne Somers Plays for G.I.'s", The New York Times, January 3, 1983.</ref> Calling her a legend in the industry, on May 2, 2014, Direct Marketing Response inducted Somers into the infomercial Hall of Fame.

She's the Sheriff
At the height of her exposure as official spokesperson for Thighmaster infomercials, Somers made her first return to a series, although not on network television. In 1987, she starred in the sitcom She's the Sheriff, which ran in first-run syndication. Somers portrayed a widow with two young kids who decided to fill the shoes of her late husband, a sheriff of a Nevada town. The show ran for two seasons.

Step by Step
In 1990, Somers returned to network TV, appearing in numerous guest roles and made-for-TV movies, mostly for ABC. Her roles in these, including the movie Rich Men, Single Women, attracted the attention of Lorimar Television and Miller-Boyett Productions, who were developing a new sitcom. Somers had starred in the film with Heather Locklear, who inadvertently directed the focus of both production companies to Somers due to Locklear's starring role on Going Places (from Lorimar and Miller/Boyett). For Lorimar, this was asking Somers back, since they alone had produced She's the Sheriff.

In September 1991, Somers returned to series TV in the sitcom Step By Step (with Patrick Duffy), which became a success on ABC's youth-oriented TGIF lineup. A week after the premiere of Step By Step, a two-hour biopic of Somers starring the actress herself, entitled Keeping Secrets (based on her first autobiography of the same title), was broadcast on ABC. The movie chronicled Somers' troubled family life and upbringing, along with her subsequent rise to fame. Playing off her rejuvenated career, Somers also launched a daytime talk show in 1994, aptly titled Suzanne Somers, which lasted one season. Step By Step continued on ABC until the end of its sixth season in 1997, whereupon the series moved to CBS that fall for what turned out to be its final season. With her sitcom now airing on CBS, Somers was chosen to co-host the network's revival of Candid Camera with Peter Funt, which began airing later that season.

Candid cohost
From 1997–99, Somers cohosted the revised Candid Camera show, when CBS chose to bring it back with Peter Funt. Somers stayed for two years before PAX TV renewed the series without her.

The Blonde in the Thunderbird

In summer 2005, Somers made her Broadway debut in a one-woman show, The Blonde in the Thunderbird, a collection of stories about her life and career. The show was supposed to run until September, but was cancelled in less than a week after poor reviews and disappointing ticket sales. She blamed the harsh reviews (The New York Times referred to it as "...a drab and embarrassing display of emotional exhibitionism masquerading as entertainment") and told the New York Post: "These men [New York critics] are curmudgeons, and maybe I went too close to the bone for them. I was lying there naked, and they decided to kick me and step on me, just like these visions you see in Iraq."Breaking Through
In 2012, Somers began an online talk show, Suzanne Somers Breaking Through, at CafeMom. 
Three of the episodes featured a reunion and reconciliation with former Three's Company co-star  Joyce DeWitt; the two had not seen nor spoken to each other in 31 years. Somers and Dewitt briefly discussed John Ritter and how glad they were that they both had spoken to him shortly before Ritter died.

The Suzanne Show
In the fall of 2012, The Suzanne Show, hosted by Somers, aired for a 13-episode season on the Lifetime Network. Somers welcomed various guests covering a wide range of topics related to health and fitness.

Dancing with the Stars

On February 24, 2015, Somers was announced as one of the stars participating on the 20th season of Dancing with the Stars. Her partner was professional dancer Tony Dovolani. Somers and Dovolani were eliminated on the fifth week of competition and finished in 9th place.

Views on medical subjects
Somers supports bioidentical hormone replacement therapy. Her book, Ageless, includes interviews with 16 practitioners of bioidentical hormone therapy, but gives extra discussion to one specific approach, the "Wiley Protocol". Somers and T. S. Wiley, the originator of the Wiley Protocol, have been criticized for their advocacy of the Wiley Protocol. A group of seven doctors, all of whom utilize bioidentical hormone therapies to address health issues in women, issued a public letter to Somers and her publisher, Crown, in which they state that the protocol is "scientifically unproven and dangerous" and cite Wiley's lack of medical and clinical qualifications. The use of bioidentical hormone therapies is a very controversial area of medicine; its efficacy has never been tested and numerous groups have expressed concern over its safety and the misleading claims made by practitioners, which was the subject of an Associated Press article:
 "The problem for many doctors, these custom-compounded products are not approved by the Food and Drug Administration. ... Somers, whose hormone regimen involves creams, injections and some 60 supplements daily, got a huge boost earlier this year from Oprah Winfrey. 'Many people write Suzanne off as a quackadoo' Winfrey said when Somers appeared on her show. 'But she just might be a pioneer.' ... Yet Winfrey's tacit support of Somers gave her some of the worst press of her career. 'Crazy Talk,' Newsweek headlined an article on the talk show host earlier this year. Another headline, on Salon.com: 'Oprah's Bad Medicine'."

In 2001, Somers was diagnosed with breast cancer. She had a lumpectomy, and radiation, but declined to undergo chemotherapy. In November 2008,  Somers announced she was diagnosed with inoperable cancer by six doctors, but she learned a week later that she was misdiagnosed. During this time, she interviewed doctors about cancer treatments and these interviews became the basis of her book, Knockout, about alternative treatments to chemotherapy. In her book Knockout, Somers promotes alternative cancer treatments, for which she was criticized by the American Cancer Society:

 "The American Cancer Society is concerned. ... 'I am very afraid that people are going to listen to her message and follow what she says and be harmed by it', says Dr. Otis Brawley, the organization's chief medical officer. 'We use current treatments because they've been proven to prolong life. They've gone through a logical, scientific method of evaluation. I don't know if Suzanne Somers even knows there IS a logical, scientific method.' ... More broadly, Brawley is concerned that in the United States, celebrities or sports stars feel they can use their fame to dispense medical advice. 'There's a tendency to oversimplify medical messages.... Well, oversimplification can kill.'"

She is also opposed to water fluoridation, calling fluoride a "toxic-waste by-product of the aluminum manufacturers."

In January 2013, she suggested that Adam Lanza went on his shooting spree at Sandy Hook Elementary School due to the level of toxins in his diet and the household cleaners he was exposed to. She stated that all these chemicals may "overelectrify the brain".

Television workAnniversary Game (1969–70)Mantrap (1971–73)Lotsa Luck (1974)The Rockford Files – The Big Ripoff (aired October 25, 1974)Sky Heist (1975)The Six Million Dollar Man 1977Starsky & Hutch (1975–79, 3 appearances)Match Game (1977/PM) (1977)The Love Boat (1977)Tattletales (1977)Three's Company (1977–81)Happily Ever After (1978)Zuma Beach (1978)Hollywood Wives (1985) (miniseries)Goodbye Charlie (1985)She's the Sheriff (1987–89)Rich Men, Single Women (1990)Step by Step (1991–98)Keeping Secrets (1991)Exclusive (1992) (also co-executive producer)The Suzanne Somers Show (1994–95)Full House (1994)Seduced by Evil (1994)8-Track Flashback (1995–98)Devil's Food (1996)Walt Disney World Christmas Day Parade (1996) (Host)Love-Struck (1997)Candid Camera (co-host from 1997–2000)No Laughing Matter (1998)The Darklings (1999)Kathy Griffin: My Life on the D-List (2009) (guest appearance)ShopNBCThe Suzanne Show (2012) (Host)The Real Housewives of Beverly Hills (2013) (guest appearance)Dancing with the Stars (2015) (contestant)Home & Family (2017)

FilmographyBullitt (1968) as Woman (uncredited)Daddy's Gone A-Hunting (1969) as Sidewalk Extra (uncredited)Fools (1970) as Woman at Baptism (uncredited)American Graffiti (1973) as Blonde in T-BirdMagnum Force (1973) as Pool Girl (uncredited)Billy Jack Goes to Washington (1977) as Party GirlIt Happened at Lakewood Manor (1977, TV Movie) as GloriaZuma Beach (1978, TV Movie) as Bonnie KattYesterday's Hero (1979) as CloudyNothing Personal (1980) as Abigail AdamsTotally Minnie (1988, TV Movie) as DirectorSerial Mom (1994) as HerselfThe Nutty Professor (1996) as Thighmaster Lady on TV (uncredited)Rusty: A Dog's Tale (1998) as Malley the Dog (narrator)Say It Isn't So'' (2001) as Gilbert's Mom / Herself (cameo, uncredited)

Published works

References

External links

1946 births
20th-century American actresses
20th-century American women writers
20th-century American non-fiction writers
21st-century American actresses
21st-century American women writers
21st-century American non-fiction writers
Alternative cancer treatment advocates
Alternative medicine activists
American autobiographers
American female models
American film actresses
American health and wellness writers
American women non-fiction writers
American self-help writers
American people of Irish descent
American television actresses
American women comedians
Comedians from California
Game show models
Living people
People from the San Francisco Bay Area
People from San Bruno, California
Pseudoscientific diet advocates
University of San Francisco alumni
Women autobiographers
Writers from California
20th-century American comedians
21st-century American comedians